Superintendencia Nacional de Aduanas y de Administración Tributaria, also known as SUNAT, is the organization which enforces customs and taxation in Peru.

References

External links
 Official site

Government agencies of Peru
Customs services
Law enforcement in Peru
Taxation in Peru